Subhas Naskar is an Indian politician, belonging to the Revolutionary Socialist Party. He served as Irrigation Minister in the Left Front government of West Bengal. He has won the Basanti Legislative Assembly seat in the 1982, 1987, 1991, 1996, 2001, 2006 and 2011 elections. After the 2011 assembly election he was elected as Deputy Leader of the Opposition in the West Bengal Legislative Assembly.

Subhas Naskar's ancestral house at Basanti was attacked during panchayat elections in 2008 and a bomb was allegedly thrown by CPI(M) supporters, fatally injuring his nephew's wife.

The son of the late Prajapati Naskar, he is a graduate and a former school teacher.

References

Revolutionary Socialist Party (India) politicians
Living people
State cabinet ministers of West Bengal
Revolutionary Socialist Party candidates in the 2014 Indian general election
West Bengal MLAs 1982–1987
West Bengal MLAs 1987–1991
West Bengal MLAs 1991–1996
West Bengal MLAs 1996–2001
West Bengal MLAs 2001–2006
West Bengal MLAs 2006–2011
West Bengal MLAs 2011–2016
1952 births
Deputy opposition leaders